Samuel Grewe (born June 10, 1998) is an American Paralympic high jumper. Grewe contracted osteosarcoma aged 13 which resulted in a pseudo-amputation procedure called a rotationplasty being performed on his right leg. Grewe jumped for the University of Notre Dame Track and Field Team, where he studied Pre-Med and resided in Fisher Hall on campus. As of 2022, Grewe attends the University of Michigan Medical School. Outside of athletics, Grewe is also a motivational speaker, including a TED Talk that he delivered in February of 2022.

Early life 
Samuel (Sam) Grewe was born and raised in Middlebury, IN. He was a student in the Middlebury Community Schools system and attended Northridge High School, where he graduated in the class of 2017. 
During the basketball season of his 7th grade year, he began to experience a sharp pain in his right knee, which he originally attributed to growing pains. However, on Christmas Eve of 2011, the pain in his knee was diagnosed as osteosarcoma. He underwent 21 sessions of chemotherapy to treat the disease. He also chose to have his leg amputated via a rare procedure called rotationplasty. This choice was based on his belief that it would give him the best chance of returning to sports.

References

External links
 
 Samuel Grewe at the University of Notre Dame
 
 
 
 
 

1998 births
Living people
Track and field athletes from Indiana
American male high jumpers
Paralympic track and field athletes of the United States
Athletes (track and field) at the 2016 Summer Paralympics
Medalists at the 2016 Summer Paralympics
Medalists at the 2020 Summer Paralympics
Paralympic medalists in athletics (track and field)
Paralympic gold medalists for the United States
Paralympic silver medalists for the United States
World Para Athletics Championships winners
Medalists at the 2019 Parapan American Games
Notre Dame Fighting Irish men's track and field athletes
People from Goshen, Indiana